Llywelyn ap Gruffydd may refer to:

Llywelyn ap Gruffydd (c. 1223 – 1282), more commonly known as Llywelyn ap Gruffudd, also known as Llywelyn Ein Llyw Olaf, Llywelyn the Last, Prince of Wales 1258–1282
Llywelyn ap Gruffydd Fychan (c. 1341 – 1401), wealthy Carmarthenshire landowner executed by Henry IV of England in punishment for his support of Owain Glyndwr's Welsh rebellion